was a Japanese domain of the Edo period, located in Tanba Province (modern-day Sasayama, Hyōgo). It was ruled by Maeda Shigekatsu (a son of Maeda Gen'i) and then by Matsudaira Yasushige, the head of the Matsui-Matsudaira clan. The domain was abolished in 1609. It was replaced by the Sasayama Domain in the same year of 1609.

References

See also 
 Tamba Sasayama

1602 establishments in Japan
1609 disestablishments
Domains of Japan
Maeda clan
Matsui-Matsudaira clan
States and territories established in 1602